Bhattarika Temple is located on the bank of Mahanadi River, at Sasanga village in the tehsil Baramba, (formerly Athgarh), Cuttack district, Odisha, India. It is dedicated to the Hindu Goddess Maa Bhattarika worshipped as a manifestation of Shakti. As per the Puranic tradition, Parashurama, facing certain defeat at the hands of Saharsrajuna, prayed to Durga who appeared on this spot to impart her divine power to his aid. The festival Pana Sankranti is celebrated here in April, Akshaya Tritiya in May and Dussehra in October.

Durga Puja is celebrated here yearly with great rejoicing.

Gallery

References

External links
photos of Bhattarika Temple

Hindu temples in Cuttack
Shakti temples